Lacaille 9352 (Lac 9352) is a red dwarf star in the southern constellation of Piscis Austrinus. With an apparent visual magnitude of 7.34, this star is too faint to be viewed with the naked eye except possibly under excellent seeing conditions. It is the eleventh closest star system to the Solar System and is the closest star in the constellation Piscis Austrinus. The ChView simulation shows that its closest neighbour is the EZ Aquarii triple star system at about 4.1 ly away.

Properties
This star has the fourth highest known proper motion, (which was first noticed by Benjamin Gould in 1881) moving a total of 6.9 arcseconds per year. However, this is still a very small movement overall, as there are 3,600 arcseconds in a degree of arc. The space velocity components of this star are  = .

The spectrum of Lacaille 9352 places it at a stellar classification of M0.5V, indicating it is a type of main sequence star known as a red dwarf. This was the first red dwarf star to have its angular diameter measured, with the physical diameter being about 47% of the Sun's radius. It has around half the mass of the Sun and the outer envelope has an effective temperature of about 3,670 K.

Planetary system

In June 2020, two super-Earth planets were reported, as well as a third signal with a period of 50.7 days that may be due to stellar activity—however, if this planet is real it may be located within the habitable zone. They were detected using the radial velocity method from observations with HARPS in Chile and HIRES in Hawaii.

See also
List of nearest stars and brown dwarfs

References

External links
SolStation.com: Lacaille 9352

217987
High-proper-motion stars
114046
0887
CD-36 15693
Local Bubble
Piscis Austrinus
M-type main-sequence stars
Planetary systems with two confirmed planets